The unmanned Brough of Birsay Lighthouse lighthouse was built in 1925 by David A Stevenson. It is located on the Brough of Birsay, an uninhabited tidal island off the north west coast of Mainland in Orkney, Scotland, in the parish of Birsay.

See also

 List of lighthouses in Scotland
 List of Northern Lighthouse Board lighthouses

References

External links 

 Northern Lighthouse Board

Lighthouses completed in 1925
Lighthouses in Orkney